John Corbett (November 14, 1869 – February 20, 1947) was an American football player and coach of multiple sports. He played football for Harvard University from 1890 to 1893 and was selected as one of the two halfbacks on the 1890 College Football All-America Team. He graduated from Harvard in 1894 and earned a master's degree from Ohio University in 1910. Corbett went on to coach football in Ohio, Oklahoma, and Wyoming. In 1914, he moved to Wyoming where he coached all of the athletic teams, including football, basketball, baseball, and track and field, for the University of Wyoming from 1914 to 1924. He remained the university's director of physical education until his retirement in September 1939. He became known as Wyoming's "Grand Old Man of Athletics." In October 1931, the University of Wyoming's athletic field was named Corbett Field in his honor. Corbett died on February 21, 1947, of an apparent heart attack at his home in Laramie, Wyoming; he was 77 years old.

Head coaching record

Football

References

External links
 

1869 births
1947 deaths
19th-century players of American football
American football halfbacks
Basketball coaches from Massachusetts
Harvard Crimson football players
Holy Cross Crusaders football coaches
Indiana Hoosiers baseball coaches
Ohio Bobcats baseball coaches
Ohio Bobcats men's basketball coaches
Wyoming Cowboys and Cowgirls athletic directors
Wyoming Cowboys football coaches
Wyoming Cowboys basketball coaches
Wyoming Cowboys and Cowgirls track and field coaches
All-American college football players
Ohio University alumni
Players of American football from Boston
Sportspeople from Boston